In enzymology, a lipopolysaccharide 3-alpha-galactosyltransferase is an enzyme that catalyzes the chemical reaction

UDP-galactose + lipopolysaccharide  UDP + 3-alpha-D-galactosyl-[lipopolysaccharide glucose]

Thus, the two substrates of this enzyme are UDP-galactose and lipopolysaccharide, whereas its two products are UDP and [[3-alpha-D-galactosyl-[lipopolysaccharide glucose]]].

This enzyme belongs to the family of glycosyltransferases, specifically the hexosyltransferases.  The systematic name of this enzyme class is UDP-galactose:lipopolysaccharide 3-alpha-D-galactosyltransferase. Other names in common use include UDP-galactose:lipopolysaccharide alpha,3-galactosyltransferase, UDP-galactose:polysaccharide galactosyltransferase, uridine diphosphate galactose:lipopolysaccharide, alpha-3-galactosyltransferase, uridine diphosphogalactose-lipopolysaccharide, and alpha,3-galactosyltransferase.  This enzyme participates in lipopolysaccharide biosynthesis and glycan structures - biosynthesis 2.

Structural studies

References

 
 

EC 2.4.1
Enzymes of known structure